Port Mòr is a harbour and settlement on the Isle of Muck in the Inner Hebrides off the west coast of Scotland.

Port Mòr is the most populated settlement on the island, currently with around fifteen residents. In 2005, a pier and causeway were built at Port Mòr to allow the ferry to dock on the island. The settlement is the site of the island's first hotel, built by Ewen MacEwen, whose family has owned Muck for over 100 years.

References

External links
www.isleofmuck.com

Populated places in Lochaber
Villages in the Inner Hebrides
Small Isles, Lochaber